Georg Guggemos (9 January 1927 – 28 January 2015) was a German ice hockey player. He competed in the men's tournament at the 1952 Winter Olympics.

References

External links
 

1927 births
2015 deaths
Olympic ice hockey players of Germany
Ice hockey players at the 1952 Winter Olympics
Sportspeople from Füssen